Melanophryniscus pachyrhynus is a species of toad in the family Bufonidae. It is known from São Lourenço do Sul in southern Brazil and from Uruguay. Populations in Uruguay were until recently considered a different species (Melanophryniscus orejasmirandai) and assessed as being vulnerable.

Its natural habitats are subtropical or tropical seasonally wet or flooded lowland grassland, intermittent freshwater lakes, and intermittent freshwater marshes. It is threatened by habitat loss.

References

pachyrhynus
Amphibians of Brazil
Amphibians of Uruguay
Amphibians described in 1920
Taxa named by Alípio de Miranda-Ribeiro
Taxonomy articles created by Polbot